El Río is the name given to the sea strait that separates La Graciosa from Lanzarote in the Canary Islands. Río, in Spanish, means 'river'.

El Río is part of the marine reserve established around La Graciosa and the islets north of Lanzarote.

Points of Interest
Caleta de Sebo is located on the strait's northwestern shore. It is the larger one of only two settlements on the island of La Graciosa.

Overlooking the strait from the southeastern shore are the cliffs of Famara, on the island of Lanzarote.

The viewpoint overlooks onto La Graciosa and the rest of the Chinijo Archipelago across the strait of El Río, after which the viewpoint is named.

The Salinas del Río are located at the feet of the cliffs of Famara along the shore of El Río. Believed to be the oldest salt evaporation ponds in the Canary Islands, the salt pans fell out of use in the second half of the twentieth century. They are, as of 2018, under restoration.

Ferries
The only way to get to the island of La Graciosa is by ferry from Lanzarote. Ferries depart Lanzarote from the port of Órzola and head into the strait of El Río to reach the port of Caleta de Sebo on La Graciosa.

As of July 2019, two ferry companies operate this service, both based on La Graciosa: Líneas Romero and Biosfera Express. Travel time is about 25 minutes.

Open Water Swimming
The Travesía a nado "El Río" is an annual open water swimming event that crosses the strait. The event first took place in September 1993 and has been organised every year since then, in either September or October depending on the tides.

References

Lanzarote
Geography of the Province of Las Palmas
Straits of Spain
Straits of the Atlantic Ocean